Condemned to Hang or Flesh for the Gallows (Spanish: Carne de horca, Italian: Il terrore dell'Andalusia) is a 1953 Italian-Spanish historical adventure film directed by Ladislao Vajda and starring Rossano Brazzi, Fosco Giachetti and Emma Penella. The film portrays the bandits of nineteenth century Andalucía. The film's art direction was by Alberto Boccianti.

Synopsis
The life of the rebel and vicious Juan Pablo de Osuna changes when his father, a rich cattleman, is murdered by Lucero, a cruel bandit of The Sierra Morena.

Looking for revenge Juan Pablo is wrongfully accused and everybody believes that he is a murderer, even Lucero's gang. He becomes member of the gang and Lucero confides him. Juan Pablo discovers that a rich man from the city of Ronda gives information about the stagecoach to the bandits, in exchange of a part of the bounty. Chasing the messenger Juan Pablo finds the traitor: he is the father of his former girlfriend.

Cast
 Rossano Brazzi as Juan Pablo de Osuna  
 Fosco Giachetti as Lucero  
 Emma Penella as Consuelo  
 José Nieto as Chiclanero  
 Félix Dafauce as Joaquín de las Hoces  
 Francisco Arenzana as Novato  
 Alessandro Fersen as Vargas 
 Aldo Silvani as Padre de Flores 
 Evar Maran as Flores  
 Arturo Bragaglia as Párroco  
 Gondrano Trucchi 
 Luis Prendes as Tomás  
 Fedele Gentile 
 John Fostini
 Roberto Zara as Rana  
 Enrico Polito 
 Adriano Dominguez as Jacinto  
 Juan Calvo as Lorenzo Ruiz  
 Rafael Calvo 
 Santiago Rivero as Oficial 2º  
 Claudio Morgan 
 José Isbert as Don Félix  
 José Sepúlveda as Miguel  
 Trinidad Heredia as Soledad  
 Rafael Cortés as Risueño  
 Guillermo Méndez as Tranquilo  
 Ángel Córdoba as Lobato  
 Antonio Ferrandis as Venancio  
 Ignacio A. Caro as Tabernero  
 José María Rodríguez as Pastor 1º  
 José Alburquerque as Juez de ronda  
 Manuel Arbó as Posadero de Utrera  
 Víctor Mengele as José  
 Pedro Vargas as Mocuelo  
 José Villasante as Curro  
 Lorenzo García as Tío Lucas  
 Faustino Flores as Hombre de Zahara  
 Tony Hernández as Chico de la taberna de Utrera  
 Curro de Cádiz as Gitano  
 Jesús Gallardo as Mendigo ciego 
 Carmen Heredia as Moza de 'Los Rosales'  
 Julio Ortas as Mozo de 'Los Rosales'  
 Arturo Marín as Romancero  
 Gino Scotti as Guarda del cortijo  
 Félix Fernández as Don Fernando 
 Peter Damon as Oficial 1º  
 Franco Pesce as Joyero  
 Raúl Cancio as Santiago

References

Bibliography 
 Mira, Alberto. Historical Dictionary of Spanish Cinema. Scarecrow Press, 2010.

External links 
 

1953 films
1950s historical adventure films
Spanish historical adventure films
Italian historical adventure films
1950s Spanish-language films
Films directed by Ladislao Vajda
Films set in Andalusia
Films set in the 19th century
Italian black-and-white films
Spanish black-and-white films
1950s Spanish films
1950s Italian films